This is a list of major whistleblowers from various countries. The individuals below brought attention to abuses of government or large corporations. Many of these whistleblowers were fired from their jobs or prosecuted in the process of shining light on their issue of concern. This lists whistleblowers associated with events that were sufficiently notable to merit a Wikipedia article either about the Whistleblower or the event;  "Year" is the year of the event.  This list is not exhaustive.

Before 1960

1960s–1970s

1980s

1990s

2000s

2010s

2020s

References

External links 

Whistleblowers
Whistleblowers